Hassan Alavikia ([hæsæn ælævikiːɒː]; 1 December 1912 – 20 April 2013) was a general and businessman in the Pahlavi pre-revolutionary government of Iran. Along with Teymur Bakhtiar and Hassan Pakravan, he was a co-founder of the SAVAK.

Early life 
Hassan Alavikia was born on 1 December 1910 in Hamedan, Iran, the son of Abu Torab Alavikia, a wealthy land owner. He completed his primary and secondary education at the Lycée St. Louis in Isfahan and Tehran. In 1932, he entered Tehran Military Academy, from which he graduated as a lieutenant in 1934. He continued his academic education at the University of Tehran and Harvard University, graduating with degrees in judicial law and philosophy. He spoke fluent Persian, French, English, and German.

Political life 
He served in the Iranian Army as Deputy Director of the Intelligence Department of the Army (1949–1951).  In 1956, he left the Second Division, and became the first Deputy Director of the SAVAK (1956–1962) with General Teymur Bakhtiar as its first Director.

In 1962, he was appointed as head of the European Operations Division of the SAVAK (1962-1967) by the Shah,  which at the time was headquartered in Cologne, Germany. He retired from the military in 1967, and continued his professional career with the establishment of several successful businesses in both the agricultural and real estate industries.

Later years 
In January 1979, he and his wife left Iran to visit their daughters in Paris, France where they were studying; however, due to the turmoil and start of the Islamic revolution, they were unable to return to Iran. He spent the remainder of his life in exile in Paris, France, Gstaad, Switzerland, and Del Mar, California, where his three daughters and their families resided.

Family 
On 6 December 1956, General Alavikia married Jila Pourrastegar, the daughter of Hossein Pourrastegar, a well-known Colonel in the Persian Cossack Brigade under Reza Shah Pahlavi. They had three children together.

Death 
He died on 20 April 2013 in La Jolla, California, surrounded by his wife, three children, and five grandchildren.

References 

2013 deaths
1910 births
People from Hamadan
Iranian centenarians
Iranian emigrants to the United States
Iranian emigrants to France
Exiles of the Iranian Revolution in France
Exiles of the Iranian Revolution in the United States
Men centenarians
People of SAVAK
Imperial Iranian Army personnel
University of Tehran alumni
Harvard University alumni